Chicago After Midnight is a lost 1928 American silent film directed by and starring Ralph Ince.

Cast
 Ralph Ince as Jim Boyd  
 Jola Mendez as Betty Boyd / Mona Gale  
 Lorraine Rivero as Betty Boyd, as a baby  
 James "Jim" Mason as Hardy  
 Carl Axzelle as Ike (the Rat)  
 Helen Jerome Eddy as Mrs. Boyd  
 Ole M. Ness as Tanner  
 Robert Seiter as Jack Waring  
 Frank Mills as Frank  
 Christian J. Frank as Casey

References

Bibliography
 Quinlan, David. The Illustrated Guide to Film Directors. Batsford, 1983.

External links

1928 films
Films directed by Ralph Ince
American silent feature films
1920s English-language films
American black-and-white films
Lost American films
Film Booking Offices of America films
1928 lost films
1920s American films